Davide Furlan (born 18 January 1986 in Italy) is an Italian footballer.

Career

While playing for Parma Calcio 1913, Furlan played in the 2004-05 UEFA Cup semifinals. However, he later suffered three knee injuries and by 2011, aged 25, he was playing in the Italian fourth division.

References

External links
 

Italian footballers
Living people
Association football midfielders
1986 births